GNAS may refer to:

 Gnas, Styria, Austria
 Horst Gnas (born 1941), German cyclist
 Georgian National Academy of Sciences
 GNAS complex locus, a protein
 Grand National Archery Society
 Naval Air Station Glenview

See also 
 GNA (disambiguation)